North Moor is a 676.3 hectare biological Site of Special Scientific Interest near Lyng in Somerset, England. It was designated a Site of Special Scientific Interest in 1986.

North Moor is a nationally important grazing marsh and ditch system on the Somerset Levels and Moors. A range of neutral grassland types supporting common and scarce plants has developed mainly due to variations in soils and management practices. Aquatic plant communities are exceptionally diverse with good populations of nationally scarce species. The site has special interest in its bird life.

North Moor was flooded during the Winter flooding of 2013–14 on the Somerset Levels.

References

External links
 English Nature website (SSSI information)

Sites of Special Scientific Interest in Somerset
Sites of Special Scientific Interest notified in 1986
Somerset Levels
Wetland Sites of Special Scientific Interest
BNorth
North Petherton